Corynesporina elegans is a species of fungi of unknown placement within Ascomycota.

References

External links 

 

Fungi described in 1994
Ascomycota enigmatic taxa